Milan Butozan (Serbian Cyrillic: Милан Бутозан; Pančevo, Vojvodina, then part of Austria-Hungary, 28 November 1905 – Zagreb, then part of Independent State of Croatia, 30 March 1943) was a Serbian painter, sculptor, graphic artist, writer, art critic and pedagogue, who was killed by the Ustasha during the Second World War.

Biography 
Milan Butozan was born in 1905 in Pančevo where he received his primary and secondary education. His serious artistic education, however, began when he enrolled at the Royal Academy of Arts in Zagreb, in the class of professor Jozo Kljaković, specializing in frescoes, and ended in Belgrade, at the Royal Art School, in 1931.

Butozan's artistic opus includes 2,000 works: numerous portraits, two cycles of frescoes, about 1,000 graphics and at least 15 sculptures, exhibited at numerous solo and group exhibitions in Pančevo, (1933, 1934, 1939) Belgrade (1933), Zagreb (1932, 1934, 1936 and 1940) and abroad. Today, his works are in several museums and private collections throughout the former Yugoslavia, Switzerland and Austria, while his personal legacy, diary and documentation of about 6,000 pages are kept in Zagreb's Archives of Fine Arts of the Croatian Academy of Sciences and Arts. In the meantime, two retrospective exhibitions were held in Pančevo, in 1959 and 2004.

He was shot and killed in Zagreb after a Croatian military interrogation in 1943. Even today, it is not known where he was buried.

Bibliography
 Nacionalna i sveučilišna biblioteka, Hrvatska bibliografija: Knjige 1–2, Biblioteka, Zagreb, (2002)

Gallery

See also
 List of Serbian painters
 Stojan Trumić

References 

1905 births
1943 deaths
People from Pančevo
Serbian artists
Serbian male writers
Serbian male painters
People executed by the Independent State of Croatia